In gemology, chatoyancy, or chatoyance or cat's eye effect, is an optical reflectance effect seen in certain gemstones, woods, and carbon fibre. Coined from the French "œil de chat", meaning "cat's eye", chatoyancy arises either from the fibrous structure of a material, as in tiger's eye quartz, or from fibrous inclusions or cavities within the stone, as in cat's eye chrysoberyl.

Description
The precipitates that cause chatoyance in chrysoberyl are the mineral rutile, composed mostly of titanium dioxide.  Examined samples have yielded no evidence of tubes or fibres. The rutile precipitates all align perpendicularly with respect to cat's eye effect. It is reasoned that the lattice parameter of the rutile matches only one of the three orthorhombic crystal axes of the chrysoberyl, resulting in preferred alignment along that direction. 

The effect can be likened to the sheen off a spool of silk: The luminous streak of reflected light is always perpendicular to the direction of the fibres. For a gemstone to show this effect best it must be cut en cabochon (rounded with a flat base rather than faceted), with the fibres or fibrous structures parallel to the base of the finished gem. The best finished specimens show a single sharply defined band of light that moves across the stone when it is rotated. Chatoyant stones of lesser quality display a banded effect as is typical with cat's-eye varieties of quartz. Faceted stones do not show the effect well.

Gem species known for this phenomenon include the aforementioned quartz, chrysoberyl, beryl (especially var. aquamarine), charoite, tourmaline, labradorite, selenite, feldspar, apatite, moonstone, thomsonite and scapolite amongst others. Glass optical cable can also display chatoyancy if properly cut, and has become a popular decorative material in a variety of vivid colors.

The term "cat's eye", when used by itself as the name of a gemstone, refers to a cat's eye chrysoberyl. It is also used as an adjective which indicates the chatoyance phenomenon in another stone, e.g., cat's eye aquamarine.

In woodworking
Chatoyancy in wood occurs in various species – particularly hardwoods and the various types of Nanmu woods of China and South East Asia, particularly where stresses from the weight of the growing tree result in denser patches, or where stresses cause burl or bird’s eye. This ‘figure’, which has a striking three-dimensional appearance, is highly prized by woodworkers and their clients alike, and is featured regularly in furniture, musical instruments, and other decorative wood products. Figuring takes on a variety of forms and is referred to as flame, ribbon, tiger stripe, quilting, among other names.

This effect is sometimes called wet look, since wetting wood with water often displays the chatoyancy, albeit only until the wood dries. Certain finishes cause the wood grain to become more pronounced. Oil finishes, epoxy, and shellac can strongly bring out the wet look effect. When the refractive index of the finish nearly matches that of the wood, light scattering no longer occurs at the wood surface, adding the appearance of depth to the wood's figure.

Measurement 
No method to measure wood chatoyance is unanimously accepted by the scientific community. Some methods have been proposed, such as one named PZC, which was used to measure typical values for a number of wood species; some results are reported below:

See also

References

General

 Webster, R., Jobbins, E. A. (Ed.). (1998). Gemmologist's compendium. St Edmundsbury Press Ltd, Bury St Edwards.
Mitchell, T. et al. Proceedings of the Electron Microscopy Society of America (EMSA), 1982.

Mineralogy
Optical phenomena